The 2021 Oregon wildfire season began in May 2021. As of August 1, it was expected that the fires might not be contained for months.

The wildfire season in Oregon experienced an early start due to an abnormally dry spring coupled with low snowpack levels amid an ongoing drought. The 2021 season has been outpacing the destructive previous season, with nearly 10 times as many acres having burned as of July 20 compared to the previous year through that date, according to the NIFC's Northwest Coordination Center.

Background 
Oregon has been experiencing increasingly large fire seasons over the last few decades, with the preceding 2020 wildfire season being one of the most destructive in the state's history. As with much of the rest of the Western United States, fire officials were predicting another above-average season in 2021 due to expected low precipitation and high temperatures. The state's declaration of the start of wildfire season in mid-May marked the earliest start to a fire season in the state in over 40 years. In preparation for the wildfire season, forest officials performed prescribed burns and state lawmakers worked on wildfire-mitigation legislation designed to create wildfire risk maps, update building codes, and create new rules related to defensible space around homes in the wildland–urban interface.

List of wildfires 

Response 
At the end of July 2021, Governor Kate Brown signed a bill to invest $220 million in wildfire prevention, preparedness, and response.

See also 

 2021 Western North America heat wave
List of Oregon wildfires

References

External links 
 

Wildfires
2021
2021 Oregon wildfires